Néotù was a contemporary furniture gallery founded in 1984 in Paris.

Gérard Dalmon (b. 1945), a computer consultant at Cap Gemini, and Pierre Staudenmeyer (1952—2007), a marketing consultant, established the Galerie Néotù in 1984 in Paris, France, on the rue de Verneuil, then in 1985 on the rue du Renard. Galerie Néotù sold contemporary furniture and other items by primarily French designers, artists, and architects. The items were produced in limited editions, some unique. The gallery assisted with production and was instrumental in establishing some of the young, essentially unknown French designers of the 1980s and 1990s, who have since become members of the current who's who of French and international design.

The enterprise pursued an approach to design, which was in the trend of the time, and focused on designers whose work was known as art furniture. Dalmon and Staudenmeyer's effort can be favorably compared to others active from the mid-1980s, such as  Rick Kaufman's Art et Industrie gallery and Michael Steinberg's Furniture of the Twentieth Century gallery, both in New York City.

In 1990, a branch was established in New York City, and, in 1992, the Galerie Néotù began representing VIA (the French furniture association) in the U.S.

Néotù closed in 2001.

Designers
Galerie Néotù has shown and sometimes manufactured works by furniture designers, architects, and artists.

 Ron Arad (industrial designer)
 Emmanuel Babled
 François Bauchet
 Vincent Bécheau & Marie-Laure Bourgeois
 Eric Benqué
 Christian Biecher
 Constantin Boym
 Ronan & Erwan Bouroullec
 Andrea Branzi
 Peter Bremers
 Eugène Brunelle
 Stephen Burks
 David Capogna
 Emmanuelle Colboc
 Denis Colomb
 Christophe Côme
 Didier Cornille
 Matali Crasset
 Designers Anonymes
 Tom Dixon (industrial designer)
 André Dubreuil
 Sylvain Dubuisson
 Epinard Bleu: Frédéric Druot, Jean-Luc Goulesque, Patrick Jean, Luis Filipe Pais de Figueiredo, Jacques Robert, Jean-Charles Zebo
 Shao Fan
 Dan Friedman (graphic designer)
 Olivier Gagnère
 Izzika Gaon
 Adrien Gardère
 Élisabeth Garouste & Mattia Bonetti
 Jean-Paul Gaultier
 Kistian Gavoille
 Christian Ghion
 Natanel Gluska
 Lyn Godley & Lloyd Schwan
 Zaha Hadid
 Massimo Iosa Ghini
 Sue Golden
 Augustin Granet
 Michael Graves
 Kevin Gray
 Eric Jourdan
 David Kawecki
 Atsushi Kitagawara
 Dominique Labauvie
 Dominique Lachevsky
 Jo Laubner
 Anne Liberati & Joris Heetman
 Mary Little
 Paul Ludick
 Alain & Thierry Manoha
 Paul Mathieu & Michael Ray
 Jean-François Maurige
 Franco Meneguzzo
 Migeon & Migéon
 Jasper Morrison
 Patrick Naggar
 Philippe Nogen
 Jiří Pelcl
 Gaetano Pesce
 Maurice de Pestre
 Claude Picasso
 Christophe Pillet
 Olivier Peyricot
 Ravage: Arnold van Geuns & Clémens Rameckers
 Thomas Rodriguez
 Pucci De Rossi
 Saint-Maur
 Bryce Sanders
 William Sawaya
 Eric Schmitt
 Borek Sipek
 Philippe Soffioti
 Ettore Sottsass
 Studio Sessanta5
 Lewis Stein
 Martin Szekely
 Ali Tayar
 Jérome Thermopyles
 Olivier Thomé
 Totem: Jacques Bonnot, Frederick du Chayla, Claire Olives
 Olivier Védrine
 Nanda Vigo
 John Webb
 Michael Young
 Marco Zanuso Jr.

Exhibitions

Exhibitions at Galerie Néotù, Paris
 1985 March - "Collection PI - Martin Szekely
 1985 April June - "Onze Lampes" - Emmanuelle Colboc, Sylvain Dubuisson, Gérard Dalmon, Olivier Gagnère, Elizabeth Garouste & Mattia Bonetti, Kevin Gray, Philippe Nogen, Pucci de Rossi, Martin Szekely, Jérome Thermopyles, Olivier Thomé - Catalogue "Onze Lampes" - Publisher Galerie Neotu
 1985 November December - "La Conversation" - Chairs by François Bauchet, Bécheau-Bourgeois, Gérard Dalmon, Epinard bleu, Olivier Gagnère, Elizabeth Garouste & Mattia Bonetti, Augustin Granet, Mary Little, Pucci de Rossi, Martin Szekely
 1986 September November - "English Eccentrics" - Ron Arad, André Dubreuil, Tom Dixon, Sue Golden, Jasper Morrisson, John Webb
 1987 September October - "Ceramics from 1955 to 1959" - Franco Meneguzzo
 1992 April May - "April in Paris" - Constantin Boym, David Capogna, Lyn Godley & Lloyd Schwan, Douglas Fitch, Paul Ludick, Ali Tayar
 1992 October November - "Colour Comedies ceramics" - Garouste & bonetti, Michael Graves, Zaha Hadid, Atsushi Kitagawara, Jo Laubner, Ettore Sottsass - made by the Waechtersbacher Keramik Workshop
 1992 November December - "Les fleurs du mal" - William Sawaya
 1999 November December - "Inside Out" - Christian Ghion
 2000 January February - "BYOB: Bring Your Own Book" - Eric Benqué, Christian Biecher, Ronan & Erwan Bouroullec, Matali Crasset, Christian Ghion, Christophe Pillet
 2000 June July - "GeoBio" - Elizabeth Garouste & Mattia Bonetti

Exhibitions at Neotu Gallery, New York
 1990 September October - "Opening Exhibition" - Elisabeth Garouste & Matia Bonetti
 1991 January February - "A Warriors Collection" - Ravage: Arnold van Geuns & Clemens Rameckers
 1991 June July - "Green Pieces" - Dan Friedman
 1991 September November - "Initials and other pieces" - Martin Szekely
 1992 September November - "Mobile Furniture Collection" - Jean-Paul Gaultier
 1992 November January - "Colour Comedies ceramics" - Elisabeth Garouste & Matia Bonetti, Michael Graves, Zaha Hadid, Atsushi Kitagawara, Jo Laubner, Ettore Sottsass - produites par Waechtersbacher Keramik Workshop
 1993 March April - "A new furniture collection" - Elisabeth Garouste & Matia Bonetti
 1993 April May - "Drawings, Objects & Furniture" - Sylvain Dubuisson
 1993 May June - "A new furniture collection" - Lyn Godley & Lloyd Schawn

Bibliography
Brochures
 1985 - "Onze Lampes" - Publisher Galerie Néotù - Paris - 1985 See the brochure

References

 1986 - "Le style des années 80" - Sophie Anargyros - Publisher Rivages/Style - Paris - 1986 - 
 1987 - "The New Furniture: Trends + Traditions" - Peter Dormer - Publisher Thames and Hudson - New York - 1987 - 
 1987 - "International Design Yearbook 3" - Philippe Starck - Publisher Abbeville Press - New York - 1987 - 
 1998 - "Design aujourd'hui" - Christine Colin - Publisher Flammarion - Paris - 1988 - 
 1988 - "MDF des créateurs pour un matériau : Exposition, Jouy-en-Josas, 24 avril-22 mai 1988" - Publisher Fondation Cartier - Paris - 1988 - 
 1988 - "Berlin: les avant-gardes du mobilier : 6 Septembre-3 Octobre 1988, Galerie des Breves du CCI, Centre G. Pompidou, Galerie VIA, Galerie Néotù, Paris" - Angela Schönberger, Centre de création industrielle - Publisher Centre Pompidou - Paris - 1988
 1990 - "Union des Arts Français" - New Art Fair '90 in Chicago - Publisher UAF - Paris/New York - 1990
 1990 - "New Italian Design" - Nally Bellati - Publisher Rizzoli - New York - 1990 - 
 1991 - "Chicago International New Art Form" - Catalogue - Publisher Lakeside Group Inc. - Chicago - 1991
 1992 - "International Design Yearbook 7''' - Andrée Putman - Publisher Abbeville Press - New York - 1992 - 
 1992 - "Sylvain Dubuisson" - Publisher AFAA - Paris - 1992 - 
 1992 - "Colour Comedies" - Publisher Nieswand Verlag - Kiel - 1992 - 
 1992 - "La France à l'Exposition universelle, Séville 1992: facettes d'une nation" - Régis Debray - Publisher Flammarion - Paris - 1992 - 
 1993 - "International Design Yearbook 8 - Bořek Šípek - Publisher Abbeville Press - New York - 1993 - 
 1994 - "International Design Yearbook 9' - Ron Arad - Publisher Abbeville Press - New York - 1994 - 
 1994 - "The Design Encyclopedia" - Mel Byars - Publisher John Wiley & Sons - New York - 1994 - 
 1995 - "Martin Szekely meublier-designer" - Brigitte Fitoussi, Didier Krzenowski, Pierre Staudenmeyer, Christian Schlatter - Publisher Hazan - Paris - 1995 - 
 1995 - "Les années 80" - Anne Bony - Publisher Les Editions du Regard - Paris - 1995 - 
 1996 - "International Design Yearbook 11' - Alexandro Mendini - Publisher Abbeville Press - New York - 1996 - 
 1998 - "Le Mobilier Francais: 1960-1998" - Yvonne Brunhammer & Marie-Laure Perrin - Publisher Charles Massin - Paris - 1998 - 
 1999 - "Inside Out" - Catalogue published for the exhibition of Christian Ghion at Neotu Gallery - Paris
 2004 - "The Design Encyclopedia" - Mel Byars - Publisher Laurence King Publishing & The Museum of Modern Art - London & New York - 2004 - 
 2007 - "Pierre Staudenmeyer et la Galerie Néotù" - AZIMUTS#29 - Constance Rubini - Publisher AZIMUTS, Cité du Design - Saint-Etienne - 2007 - 

Magazines
 1984 - City Magazine International #3 - Société de Presse et d'Éditions - Genève - 1984
 1993 - "Design Museum Map" - Axis #47 World Design Journal - Tokyo - 1993
 2000 - "Salon du Meuble de Paris/Off event''" - Axis #34 Design with a name - Tokyo - 2000

External links
 Neotu Gallery
 Pompidou Center - Paris - Exhibition: "Carrefour de la création - Un éditeur de design : la galerie Neotu"
 Musee des Arts Decoratifs - Paris - Collections
 MUDE "Museu do Design e da Moda" - Lisbon
 Fond National d'Art Contemporain - Paris - Collections
 Fond National d'Art Contemporain - Paris - Exhibition: "Design en stock"
 Encyclopedia Universalis

Contemporary art galleries in France
French furniture designers
Art galleries established in 1984
Art galleries disestablished in 2001
1984 establishments in France
2001 disestablishments in France